Mercedes Rose is an American actress who was born in Salem, Oregon. She has appeared in five TV programs and seven movies, two of them were leading roles. She is also producer and actress in The Haunting of Sunshine Girl on YouTube. She also played Jennifer in Trainmaster. She has also voiced the Mario character Rosalina in the following games: Super Mario Galaxy, Mario Kart Wii, Super Mario Galaxy 2, and Super Mario 3D All-Stars.

Roles

Movies
 Hope
 What the Bleep Do We Know?
 Train Master
 Down the Rabbit Hole
 The Waiting List
 Train Master 2
 The Bicyclists Film
 The Haunting of Sunshine Girl: The Movie
 All the Labor
 Caged Animals
 Ravana's Game
 Crackin' The Code
 Did You Kiss Anyone?
 The Falls: Testament of Love

Television
 Leverage
 Vicky Vixen
 Animus Cross
 Nick Bradley Might Be an Alcoholic
 The Paranormalist
 Funny or Die Presents

Video games
 Star Trek Online (voice)
 This is Vegas (voice)
 America's Next Top Model (voice)
 Tabula Rasa (voice)
 Earthrise (voice)
 The Blackwell Deception (voice)
 Super Mario Galaxy (voice)
 Mario Kart Wii (voice)
 Super Mario Galaxy 2 (voice)
 Super Mario 3D All-Stars (voice)

Online projects
 The Haunting of Sunshine Girl

Shorts
 Hath No Fury
 Will
 Going to the Chapel
 I Am Not a Chair

External links
 
 
 
 
 

American film actresses
American television actresses
American video game actresses
American voice actresses
Living people
20th-century American actresses
21st-century American actresses
Year of birth missing (living people)